The 2013 ICC World Cricket League Americas Region Twenty20 Division Two is a cricket tournament that took place between 5–9 February 2013. The Bahamas hosted the event.

Teams
Teams that qualified are as follows:

Squads

Fixtures

Group stage

Points table

Matches

Statistics

Most Runs
The top five run scorers (total runs) are included in this table.

Most Wickets
The top five wicket takers (total wickets) are listed in this table.

See also

2013 ICC World Twenty20 Qualifier

References

2014 ICC World Twenty20
2013 in cricket
ICC Americas Twenty20 Division Two